The  Bengal Chamber of Commerce and Industry is a non-governmental trade association and advocacy group based in West Bengal, India. It is the oldest chamber of commerce in India, and one of the oldest in Asia.

Established in 1853, finding its origin in 1833–34, it is the only such institution in India.

The organization has its headquarters at the former Royal Exchange in B. B. D. Bagh, Kolkata, which was once the residence of Lord William Bentinck, the first Governor-General of India.

Membership
The members include corporations and industries of all sizes, professionals, divisions of large multinational corporations and service industry organizations. The corporate members are drawn largely from the sectors of agriculture, engineering, textiles, leather, fast-moving consumer goods and customer services, and are not confined to West Bengal and the Eastern Region, but are from all over India.

History
The Bengal Chamber of Commerce was founded in 1853, replacing the former Calcutta Chamber of Commerce, which was merged into the new organization. At the outset, it had eighty-six members in Calcutta and eighteen others. Its objects included  –
To establish just and equitable principles in trade;
To form a code or codes of practice to facilitate transaction of business;
To maintain uniformity in rules, regulations and usages of trade;
To communicate with Chambers of Commerce and other mercantile and public bodies throughout the world, and concert and promote measures for the protection of trade and traders.

On 30 November 1857, as a result of the Indian Mutiny, the Chamber appealed to the Government of India to send "a force of Europeans, either sailors or soldiers" to defend Akyab, as it considered the Arracan Battalion not to give enough protection. It was concerned about "the safety of the inhabitants and the security of the public treasury". The Secretary to the Government replied on 2 December, regretting that "there is no European force available at present."

In 1876, at a time when silver was falling in value, chiefly due to the opening of new mines in the United States, the Bengal Chamber of Commerce was so concerned that it proposed that the Government of India should suspend the coining of silver. The Economist of 5 August 1876 reported that 

The Chamber and its business were greatly disrupted by the partition of India and the partition of Bengal in 1947, with West Bengal becoming part of the new Dominion of India and East Bengal going to the Dominion of Pakistan. Despite this, changes in the Chamber were later described as "slow and incremental". New businesses joined the Chamber, and its first Indian President of the new era was elected in 1958. It developed from a gentlemen's club of able merchants whose chief concern was with trade into a modern organization with as much concern for industry as for trade. Whereas the officers and committee members had previously been the owners of capital, they were now more likely to be professional senior managers.

Notable people
James Lyle Mackay, later first Earl of Inchcape, was elected president of the Chamber in 1890, and Ernest Cable in 1903, followed by Sir Apcar Alexander Apcar KCSI from 1904 to 1907. Archibald Birkmyre (1875–1935) was vice-president, and John Jardine Paterson was President in 1966.

In 2004, O. P. Jindal (1930–2005) was awarded the Chamber's Lifetime Achievement Award for his outstanding contribution to the Indian Steel Industry.

List of presidents

John N. Bullen: 1865
George Yule 1878-79
Sir Alexander Wilson : 1885
Henry Blois Hawkins Turner : 1886–1887
James Lyle Mackay, later first Earl of Inchcape, 1890
Sir Allan Arthur : 1894–95, 1896–97, part of 1898, 1899–1900
Sir Montagu Cornish Turner: 1898, 1901, 1902
Sir George Henry Sutherland : 1900–1901
Ernest Cable, 1903
Sir Apcar Alexander Apcar KCSI, 1904 to 1907
Sir Ruthven Grey Monteath: 1914
Sir Francis Hugh Stewart : 1915
Sir Edward Hugh Bray : 1917
Sir Walter Erskine Crum : 1919–20
Sir Alexander Robertson Murray : 1920
Sir Campbell Rhodes : 1922
Sir Willoughby Langer Carey : 1923
Sir William Crawford Currie : 1924–1925
Sir John William Anderson Bell : 1926–1927
Sir Basil Eden Garth Eddis : 1927–1928
Sir Edward Charles Benthall : 1932 and 1936
Sir George Riddoch Campbell : 1935–36 and 1938–39
Sir (John) Henry Richardson : 1940
Sir (Robert) Renwick Haddow : 1942–43 and 1945–46
Sir John Henry Burder : 1943–1944
Sir Kenneth William Mealing : 1944–1945
Sir Harry Townend : 1946–1947
Sir Hugh Douglas Cumberbatch : 1947–1948
Sir Arthur Paul Benthall : 1948 and 1950
Sir Anthony Joseph Elkins : 1949
Sir Albert Ridgeby Foster :
Sir Charles Alexander Innes : 1952–1953
Ernest John Pakes (1899–1988): 1953–1954
Sir George Mason MacKinlay : 1954–1955
Sir (George) Alexander Sim : 1955–1956
Sir Owain Trevor Jenkins : 1956–1957
Sir Walter Harold Strachan Michelmore : 1957
Sir John Douglas Keith Brown : 1958–1960
Sir Henry Morton Leech Williams : 1960
Sir Nicol Stenhouse : 1961–1962
Sir Hugh MacKay-Tallack : 1962–1963
Sir Alec Drummond Ogilvie : 1964–1965
Sir James Harvey Kincaid Stewart Lindsay : 1965
Sir John Jardine Paterson : 1966-1967
Sir Cyril Alfred Pitts : 1967–1968
Sir (John) Michael Parsons : 1968–1970
Mr. A. K. Sen: 1970-1971
Mr. Bhaskar Mitter: 1971-1972
Mr. A. N. Haksar: 1972-1973
Mr. A.W.B. Hayward: 1973-1974
Mr.D.P. Goenka: 1974-1975
Mr. A. L Mudaliar: 1975-1976
Mr.J. Sengupta: 1976-1978
Mr.P.Z. Baldik: 1978-1979
Mr. S. K. Mehera: 1979-1980
Mr.H.D. Wahi: 1980-1981
Mr. R. S. Mamak: 1981-1982
Mr. S. P. Acharya: 1982-1983
Mr.T.D. Sinha: 1983-1984
Mr. A. Mazumdar: 1984-1985
Mr. S. D. Singh: 1985-1986
Mr. R. S. Sikand: 1986-1987
Mr. P. K. Gupta: 1987-1988
Mr. Samir Ghosh: 1988-1989
Mr. K. S. B. Sanyal: 1989-1990
Dr. Abhijit Sen: 1990-1991
Mr. Mumtaz Ahmad: 1991-1992
Mr. Biji K. Kurien: 1992-1993
Mr. K. C. Mehra: 1993-1994
Mr. P. B. Ghosh: 1994-1995
Mr. P. K. Dutt: 1995-1996
Mr. H. P. Barooah: 1996-1997
Mr. S. S. Prasad: 1997-1998
Dr. Bhaskar Banerjee: 1998-1999
Mr. B. D. Bose: 1999-2000
Mr. S. B. Ganguly: 2000-2001
Mr.S.K. Dhall: 2001-2002
Mr. Sumit Mazumder: 2002-2003
Mr. Biswadip Gupta: 2003-2004
Mr. A. Lahiri: 2004-2005
Mr. Aloke Mookherjea: 2005-2006
Mr. S. Radhakrishnan: 2006-2008
Mr. Anup Singh: 2008-2009
Mr. Sandipan Chakravortty: 2009-2011
Mr. Harsh K Jha: 2011-2012
Mr. Kallol Datta: 2012-2014
Dr. Alok Roy: 2014-2015
Mr. Ambarish Dasgupta: 2015-2016
Mr. Sutanu Ghosh: 2016-2017
Mr. Chandra Shekhar Ghosh: 2017-2018
Mr. Indrajit Sen: 2018-2019
Mr. B B Chatterjee: 2019-2020
Mr. Deb A Mukherjee: 2020-2021
Mr. Abraham Stephanos: 2021–Present

External links
bengalchamber.com, official web site

Notes

1853 establishments in India
Trade associations based in India
Chambers of commerce in India
Ministry of Micro, Small and Medium Enterprises
Non-profit organisations based in India
Organisations based in Kolkata
Organizations established in 1853